Alun Millward Davies FRS FRSE FLSW FMedSci (born 2 August 1955) is a Welsh biologist, Distinguished Research Professor, School of Biosciences, Cardiff University, since 2004.

References

1955 births
Living people
Welsh biologists
Academics of Cardiff University
Fellows of the Royal Society
Fellows of the Royal Society of Edinburgh
Fellows of the Learned Society of Wales
Fellows of the Academy of Medical Sciences (United Kingdom)